Moggallana II was King of Anuradhapura in the 6th century, whose reign lasted from 540 to 560. He succeeded his brother Dathappabhuti as King of Anuradhapura and was succeeded by his son Kittisiri Meghavanna.

See also
 List of Sri Lankan monarchs
 History of Sri Lanka

External links
 Kings & Rulers of Sri Lanka
 Codrington's Short History of Ceylon

Monarchs of Anuradhapura
M
M
M